Ernst-Rüdiger Olderog (born 4 June 1955) is a German computer scientist. He is a full professor at the University of Oldenburg in Oldenburg, northern Germany.

Olderog comes from Bredenbek in Schleswig-Holstein, northern Germany, and studied computer science, mathematics and logic at the University of Kiel, where he received his doctorate in 1981 supervised by Prof. Hans Langmaack on Hoare-style characterization systems for ALGOL-like programming languages. After several research visits abroad (including the Programming Research Group at the University of Oxford and in Amsterdam, Edinburgh, Yorktown Heights and Saarbrücken), he habilitated at Kiel University in 1989 as well. Since 1989, Olderog has been based at the Department of Computer Science, University of Oldenburg. In 1994, Olderog, together with his colleague Manfred Broy, was awarded the Deutsche Forschungsgemeinschaft (DFG) Gottfried Wilhelm Leibniz Prize, worth three million DM. From 1995 to 2005, Olderog was chairman of the IFIP Working Group 2.2 on Formal Description of Programming Concepts. In 1998, he received the Silver Core Award from IFIP for his work in this IFIP group. Olderog was editor of the journal Acta Informatica and has been a member of the Academia Europaea since 2012.

Olderog is professor of theoretical computer science at the Carl von Ossietzky University Oldenburg. He is head of the Department of Correct Systems Development, whose research is related to the field of programming theory. The aim of this work is the development of procedures for the systematic creation of correct software for parallel and distributed systems with time requirements. Olderog is the author of several scientific books.

In 2015, a symposium was held at the Carl von Ossietzky University Oldenburg celebrating Olderog's 60th birthday, with an associated Festschrift.

Books
Olderog has authored, coauthored, coedited the following books:

References

External links
 Ernst-Rüdiger Olderog home page
 
 Ernst-Rüdiger Olderog at DBLP Bibliography Server

1955 births
People from Rendsburg-Eckernförde
University of Kiel alumni
Members of the Department of Computer Science, University of Oxford
IBM Research computer scientists
Academic staff of the University of Oldenburg
German computer scientists
Formal methods people
Academic journal editors
Gottfried Wilhelm Leibniz Prize winners
Members of Academia Europaea
Living people